Formicoxenus provancheri, common name shampoo ant, is a species of ant in the subfamily Myrmicinae. It is found in Canada and the United States.

References

External links

Myrmicinae
Hymenoptera of North America
Insects described in 1895
Taxonomy articles created by Polbot